is a passenger railway station located in  Kanagawa-ku, Yokohama, Kanagawa Prefecture, Japan, operated by the private railway company Keikyū.

Lines
Koyasu Station is served by the Keikyū Main Line and is located 19.3 kilometers from the terminus of the line at Shinagawa  Station in Tokyo.

Station layout
The station consists of two elevated island platforms with the station building underneath.

Station layout

History
Koyasu Station opened on December 24, 1905. In March 1952, the station was expanded with a second platform.

Keikyū introduced station numbering to its stations on 21 October 2010; Koyasu Station was assigned station number KK33.

Passenger statistics
In fiscal 2019, the station was used by an average of 7,775 passengers daily. 

The passenger figures for previous years are as shown below.

Bus services 
 bus stop (on Route 15)
Yokohama Municipal Bus
<24>Yokohama West Exit - Kanagawa Police Station mae - Koyasu - Shin-Koyasu - Namamugi
<68>Yokohama Sta. mae - Kanagawa Police Station mae - Koyasu - Shin-Koyasu – Namamugi

Surrounding area
 Japan National Route 15
 Ōguchi Station

See also
 List of railway stations in Japan

References

External links

 

Railway stations in Kanagawa Prefecture
Railway stations in Japan opened in 1905
Keikyū Main Line
Railway stations in Yokohama